The 1966–67 Serie A season was won by Juventus, it was their second scudetto of the 1960s. The season was closely contested and went down to the final day of the season; Internazionale were left needing just a draw or having Juventus not beat Lazio to win the title. However, Inter lost 1–0 on the final day to Mantova thanks to a goal from one of their former players, Beniamino Di Giacomo. Juventus on the other hand beat Lazio 2–1 to take their 13th title.

Teams
Venezia, Lecco and Mantova had been promoted from Serie B.

Events
A transitional relegation place was added to reduce the league to 16 clubs.

Six out of the eighteen clubs came from Lombardy, a record for a single region of Italy.

Final classification

Results

Top goalscorers

References and sources
Almanacco Illustrato del Calcio - La Storia 1898-2004, Panini Edizioni, Modena, September 2005

External links
  - All results on RSSSF Website.

Serie A seasons
Italy
1966–67 in Italian football leagues